Les Sneddon (born 20 July 1941) was a Scottish footballer who played for Dumbarton, Albion Rovers and Brechin City.

References

1941 births
Scottish footballers
Dumbarton F.C. players
Albion Rovers F.C. players
Brechin City F.C. players
Scottish Football League players
Living people
Association football inside forwards